The Norway women's national handball team represents Norway at international handball competitions, and is governed by the Norges Håndballforbund (NHF). As of 2022, Norway has been in 24 finals and is regarded as one of the finest women's national handball team ever.

Norway women's national handball team holds the distinction in the sport for being the only handball team, on the women's side, and men's side, to have won the European Championship four consecutive times. Their 9 gold medals is a sport record. In 2011, they became the sport's third team and the second Women's team, following Denmark to have held all three titles simultaneously: The World Championship, the Olympic Championship and the Euro Championship. In 2015, they won the World Championship and have the distinction of the first Women's handball team to hold simultaneously international titles twice: the 2015 World Championship, the 2014 European Championship and the 2012 Olympic Championship.

As of November 2022, they are the reigning double European champions as well as defending World Champions.

History
Norway has been among the world elite in women's handball since the break-through at the 1986 World Championship where the team won a bronze medal. Since then, Norway has won eight European Championships, and four World Championships. Norway has been in four final matches at the Summer Olympics, and gold medaled in Beijing 2008 and London 2012. Norway is unsurpassed in the European Championships, having won eight golds, three silvers, and one bronze in fourteen tournaments. The 2000 European Championship where they ended 6th and in the 2018 European Championship where they ended 5th, is the only times Norway finished outside of the top three.

Early years (1946–1983)
The very first match of the Norwegian women's national handball team, against Sweden in 1946, was met with great public interest. The game ended 2–5 in favour of Sweden. During the fifties and sixties women's handball had a relatively low profile in Norway. The national team regularly participated at the Scandinavian Championships, and they qualified for the World Championships in 1971, 1973, 1975 and 1982, placing 7th twice and 8th twice.

Jacobsen period (1984–1993)
Sven-Tore Jacobsen coached the national team for ten years, from 1984 to 1993. The team qualified for the 1986 World Championships, where they sensationally won the bronze medal, and they achieved Olympic silver medals in both 1988 and 1992. The press coverage and popularity of female handball in Norway increased significantly during this period.

Breivik period (1994–2009)
Former player Marit Breivik coached the team from 1994 to 2009. During her tenure, the team won six gold medals in international championships. Their achievements included gold medals at the 1999 World Championships, four gold medals at the European Championships from 1998 to 2008, and gold medals at the 2008 Summer Olympics. Their play strategy included a strong 6–0 defense and frequent fast breaks on offense.

2008
After the defeat against Russia at the 2007 World Championship, Norway faced two important challenges in 2008: Olympic Games in August and European Championship in December. The team won their first Olympic gold medal, and they won the European Championship.

Olympic Games 2008, Beijing

Norway had qualified for the 2008 Summer Olympics by winning the 2006 European Championship. The preparation for Beijing started months before the competition started, but the final squad wasn't decided until the last weeks. Several players who had trained with the team up to this point were left out or kept as reserves, most notably Isabel Blanco and Terese Pedersen. There were no debuts in the group selected by Marit Breivik, but veteran Tonje Larsen made her comeback to the team after five years of struggle with injury. Gro Hammerseng maintained her usual role of team captain, with Else-Marthe Sørlie Lybekk and Gøril Snorroeggen completing the "captains team" as vice-captains.

The competition for the Norwegian team started on 9 August against the host, China. They defeated the Chinese 30–26 and then went on to win comfortably against Angola (31–17), Kazakhstan (35–19) and France (34–24). The closest result of the preliminary round was the last match, on 17 August, against Romania (24–23). During the warm up of this match Katja Nyberg suffered a knee injury that prevented her from playing the quarter final against Sweden. Norway defeated the Swedish team 31–24, advancing to the semi-finals comfortably.

The semi-final match was played on 21 August. Former Olympic and World Champions South Korea turned out to be the toughest opponent of the tournament. After 58 minutes of play Norway was leading 28–25. In less than two minutes the Koreans managed to score three goals in a row, reaching the tie score of 28–28 with only two seconds left. Katrine Lunde Haraldsen quickly started the last attack of the game with a pass to Karoline Dyhre Breivang, who was already at the middle of the field. Breivang passed the ball on to Hammerseng who scored at the 60 minutes mark. The goal was validated by the referees but the Norwegians refrained from celebrating until the IHF delegate finally confirmed the decision.

The final match was played on 23 August. It was a replay of the 2007 World Championship, Norway vs Russia. The Norwegian victory was secured early on. They were already leading by 10 goals after 14 minutes played and Trefilov's team never managed to lower that margin below a five-goal difference. The match ended 34–27 for Norway. Linn-Kristin Riegelhuth was top scorer with nine goals out of ten shots.

The Norwegian team received their first Olympic gold medal after the final match. Two Norwegian players were selected into the tournament's All-Star Team: Katrine Lunde Haraldsen as goalkeeper and Else-Marthe Soerlie-Lybekk as pivot. Lunde Haraldsen was also overall top goalkeeper with a 42% save rate while Kari Aalvik Grimsbø ranked first (together with Korean Oh Yongran) at 7-metres shots with a 40% rate. Regarding team statistics, Lybekk finished the tournament as Norway's top scorer with 31 goals and a 72% scoring rate, two points ahead of Riegelhuth who scored the same number of goals but with a 70% success rate.

European Championship 2008, Macedonia
After the Olympic Games, Breivik encountered challenges for the 2008 European Championship: Lybekk retired from the national team, Snorroeggen was recovering from a shoulder injury and both Hammerseng and Nyberg would forego international play in order to recover from recent sport activity with only club matches.

Thus a new squad was formed. Three players made their debut: Heidi Løke (pivot) and Tine Rustad Kristiansen (centre back) from Larvik, and Camilla Herrem (left wing) from Byåsen. With the three members of the Olympic "captains team" out, Kristine Lunde was appointed new captain with Marit Malm Frafjord and Karoline Dyhre Breivang as vice-captains.

Norway was a favorite to win the European title, especially after winning the GF World Cup '08 and Møbelringen Cup 2008. Spain was not overcome with the perceived invincibility of the competition when Norway lost to them the first match of the tournament on 3 December. The Norwegians could only tie 21–21 against Spain, the same team which left them out of the 2004 Summer Olympics in 2003. Following that first disappointment, they managed to advance through the preliminary round and main round without a loss.

The semi-final match was played on 13 December against Russia. It was an easy win for Norway and even goalkeeper Haraldsen was able to score once. On 14 December, Spain was waiting at the final match. After an even first half the score was 13–12 for the defending champions. During the second half Norway increased the lead to a final score of 34–21.

Euro 2008 was the third European Championship gold in a row for Norway, and the fourth title in the history of the team. Linn-Kristin Riegelhuth was top scorer of the tournament with 51 goals and four Norwegian players were included in the All-Star Team: Riegelhuth as right wing, Katrine Lunde Haraldsen as goalkeeper, Tonje Larsen as left back and Kristine Lunde as center back. Lunde was also named MVP.

Hergeirsson period (2009–)
In 2009 Thorir Hergeirsson took over as coach, and the first season resulted in a bronze medal at the 2009 World Championships. A year later, in 2010, the team won its 5th European Championship title and in 2011 its second World Championship. In August 2012, the team defended its Beijing Olympic gold by beating Montenegro 26–23 in the final at the Olympic Games in London. In the European Championship the same year, the two teams met again. This time Montenegro beat Norway, who won silver. The Norwegian team won another gold medal at the 2014 European Women's Handball Championship, and at the 2015 World Women's Handball Championship in Denmark they won their third World Championship title. They won a bronze medal at the 2016 Olympics, having lost to Russia in the semi-final after extra time. At the 2016 European Women's Handball Championship in Sweden, the Norwegian team won their seventh title. The team won a silver medal at the 2017 World Women's Handball Championship in Germany, defeated by France in the final. At the 2018 European Women's Handball Championship in France they failed to reach the semi-finals, but finished 5th after defeating Sweden in the top 5 match.

Honours

Competitive record
 Champions   Runners-up   Third place   Fourth place

Olympic Games
Since their first appearance in 1988, Norway has participated in eight Olympic Games. They received their first gold medal twenty years after the debut, in Beijing 2008.

World Championship
Norway received their first World Championship medal in 1986, when they defeated three-time champions East Germany 23–19 in the third place play-off, marking also their first ever win over East Germany. They achieved a bronze medal in 1993, and a silver medal in 1997. In 1999 Norway won their first gold medal after a final match against France that needed two overtimes to break the tie. They won their second title in 2011, and their third title in 2015.

European Championship
As of 2020, Norway has participated in every European Championship that has taken place. They are the most successful team in the Championships, having won nine golds, three silvers, and one bronze out of fourteen tournaments. The two times Norway finished outside of the top three were at the 2000 Championship in Romania and the 2018 Championship in France.

Other tournaments
 Carpathian Trophy 1977 – Sixth place
 GF World Cup '05 – Winner
 GF World Cup '07 – Third place
 GF World Cup '08 – Winner
 GF World Cup '09 – Second place
 GF World Cup '10 – Second place
 Møbelringen Cup 2001 – Second place
 Møbelringen Cup 2002 – Second place
 Møbelringen Cup 2003 – Winner
 Møbelringen Cup 2004 – Winner
 Møbelringen Cup 2005 – Third place
 Møbelringen Cup 2006 – Winner
 Møbelringen Cup 2007 – Winner
 Møbelringen Cup 2008 – Winner
 Møbelringen Cup 2009 – Winner
 Møbelringen Cup 2010 – Winner
 Møbelringen Cup 2011 – Winner
 Møbelringen Cup 2012 – Third place
 Møbelringen Cup 2013 – Winner
 Møbelringen Cup 2014 – Second place
 Møbelringen Cup 2015 – Second place
 Møbelringen Cup 2016 – Winner
 Møbelringen Cup 2017 – Winner
 Møbelringen Cup 2018 – Winner
 Intersport Cup 2019 – Winner
 Intersport Cup 2021 – Winner
 EHF Euro Cup 2022 – Winner
 Golden League 2023 – Winner

Team

Current squad
The squad chosen for two matches against Montenegro in April 2023.

Head coach: Þórir Hergeirsson

Caps and goals as of 16 March 2023.

Extended squad

Coaching staff

Past squads
1971 World Championship (7th place)
Liv Bjørk, Siri Keul, Sissel Buchholdt, Bjørg Andersen, Eldbjørg Willassen, Karen Fladset, Astri Knudsen Bech, Sigrid Halvorsen, Astrid Skei Høsøien, Unni Anisdahl, Inger-Johanne Tveter, Lille Storberg, Anne Hilmersen, Berit Moen Johansen.

1973 World Championship (8th place)
Liv Bjørk, Siri Keul, Sissel Buchholdt, Bjørg Andersen, Karen Fladset, Kari Aagaard, Astri Knudsen Bech, Sigrid Halvorsen, Unni Anisdahl, Inger-Johanne Tveter, Grethe Tønnesen, Hjørdis Høsøien, Wenche Wensberg, Svanhild Sponberg.

1975 World Championship (8th place)
Liv Bjørk, Siri Keul, Sissel Buchholdt, Marit Breivik, Bjørg Andersen, Kari Aagaard, Astri Knudsen Bech, Unni Anisdahl, Anne Aanestad Winter, Turid Sannes, Hjørdis Høsøien, Wenche Wensberg, Randi Elisabeth Dyrdal, Lisabeth H. Muhrer.
Coach: Frode Kyvåg

1982 World Championship (7th place)
Liv Bjørk, Linn Siri Jensen, Turid Smedsgård, Heidi Sundal, Hanne Hegh, Sissel Buchholdt, Britt Johansen, Kristin Midthun, Marit Breivik, Ingunn Thomassen Berg, Kristin Glosimot Kjeldsberg, Wenche Halvorsen Stensrud, Åse Nygård Pedersen, Ingunn Rise Kirkeby, Susanne Hannestad.
Coach: Karen Fladset

1986 World Championship (Third place)
Kristin Midthun, Heidi Sundal, Trine Haltvik, Ingrid Steen, Åse Birkrem, Cathrine Svendsen, Hanne Hegh (captain), Hanne Hogness, Anne Migliosi, Kristin Eide, Karin Pettersen, Karin Singstad, Unni Birkrem, Linn-Siri Jensen, Kjerstin Andersen.
Coach: Sven-Tore Jacobsen

1988 Summer Olympics (Second place)
Annette Skotvoll, Berit Digre, Cathrine Svendsen, Hanne Hegh (captain), Hanne Hogness, Heidi Sundal, Karin Singstad, Ingrid Steen, Karin Pettersen, Kjerstin Andersen, Kristin Midthun, Susann Goksør, Marte Eliasson, Trine Haltvik, Vibeke Johnsen.
Coach: Sven-Tore Jacobsen

1990 World Championship (6th place)
Kjerstin Andersen, Annette Skotvoll, Reidun Gunnarson, Susann Goksør Kjersti Grini, Trine Haltvik, Hanne Hegh (captain), Hanne Hogness, Marte Eliasson, Kristin Cecilie Karlsen, Cathrine Svendsen, Tonje Sagstuen, Karin Pettersen, Tone Anne Alvestad Seland
Coach: Sven-Tore Jacobsen

1992 Summer Olympics (Second place)
Annette Skotvoll, Cathrine Svendsen, Hanne Hogness (captain), Hege Frøseth, Heidi Sundal, Heidi Tjugum, Henriette Henriksen, Ingrid Steen, Karin Pettersen, Kristine Duvholt, Mona Dahle, Siri Eftedal, Susann Goksør, Tonje Sagstuen.
Coach: Sven-Tore Jacobsen

1993 World Championship (Third place)
Cecilie Leganger, Anette Skottvoll, Hege Frøseth, Susann Goksør (captain), Siri Eftedal, Connie Mathisen, Mette Davidsen, Mona Dahle, Marte Eliasson, Kristine Duvholt, Karin Pettersen, Heidi Sundal, Hege Kristine Kvitsand, Tonje Sagstuen, Cathrine Svendsen.
Coach: Sven-Tore Jacobsen

1994 European Championship (Third place)
Cecilie Leganger, Annette Skotvoll, Monica Løken, Tonje Larsen, Kjersti Grini, Tonje Sagstuen, Susann Goksør (captain), Kristine Moldestad, Kristine Duvholt, Marte Eliasson, Kari Solem, Hege Kristine Kvitsand, Mona Dahle, Ingrid Steen, Siri Eftedal
Coach: Marit Breivik

1995 World Championship (4th place)
Heidi Tjugum, Cecilie Leganger, Annette Skotvoll, Susann Goksør (captain), Mette Davidsen, Kjersti Grini, Ann Cathrin Eriksen, Mona Dahle, Tonje Sagstuen, Tonje Larsen, Hege Kristin Kvitsand, Cathrine Svendsen, Kristine Moldestad
Coach: Marit Breivik

1996 Summer Olympics (4th place)
Ann Cathrin Eriksen, Annette Skotvoll, Hege Kvitsand, Heidi Tjugum, Hilde Østbø, Kari Solem, Kjersti Grini, Kristine Duvholt, Kristine Moldestad, Mette Davidsen, Mona Dahle, Sahra Hausmann, Susann Goksør (captain), Tonje Larsen, Trine Haltvik.
Coach: Marit Breivik

1996 European Championship (Second place)
Heidi Tjugum, Jeanette Nilsen, Annette Skotvoll, Tonje Larsen, Kjersti Grini, Sahra Hausmann, Susann Goksør (captain), Kari Solem, Monica Vik Hansen, Trine Haltvik, Kristine Moldestad, Mette Davidsen, Janne Tuven, Ellen Thomsen, Silje Bolset.
Coach: Marit Breivik

1997 World Championship (Second place)
Heidi Tjugum, Jeanette Nilsen, Lise Kristiansen, Tonje Sagstuen, Susann Goksør Bjerkrheim (captain), Trine Haltvik, Mette Davidsen, Tonje Larsen, Janne Tuven, Anette Tveter, Kari Solem, Sahra Hausmann, Monica Vik Hansen, Ellen Thomsen.
Coach: Marit Breivik

1998 European Championship (Winner)
Ann Cathrin Eriksen, Camilla Carstens, Cecilie Leganger, Elisabeth Hilmo, Elise Margrete Alsand, Else-Marthe Sørlie Lybekk, Heidi Tjugum, Janne Tuven, Jeanette Nilsen, Kjersti Grini (captain), Mette Davidsen, Mia Hundvin, Sahra Hausmann, Siv Heim Sæbøe, Tonje Larsen, Trine Haltvik.
Coach: Marit Breivik

1999 World Championship (Winner)
Ann Cathrin Eriksen, Birgitte Sættem, Cecilie Leganger, Elisabeth Hilmo, Else-Marthe Sørlie, Heidi Tjugum, Jeanette Nilsen, Kjersti Grini, Kristine Duvholt, Marianne Rokne, Mette Davidsen, Mia Hundvin, Sahra Hausmann, Susann Goksør Bjerkrheim (captain), Tonje Larsen, Trine Haltvik.
Coach: Marit Breivik

2000 Summer Olympics (Third place)
Ann Cathrin Eriksen, Birgitte Sættem, Cecilie Leganger, Elisabeth Hilmo, Else-Marthe Sørlie, Heidi Tjugum, Jeanette Nilsen, Kjersti Grini, Kristine Duvholt, Marianne Rokne, Mia Hundvin, Monica Sandve, Susann Goksør Bjerkrheim (captain), Tonje Larsen, Trine Haltvik.
Coach: Marit Breivik

2000 European Championship (6th place)
Birgitte Sættem, Camilla Carstens, Camilla Thorsen, Cecilie Thorsteinsen, Elisabeth Hilmo, Else-Marthe Sørlie (captain), Gro Hammerseng, Hege Christin Vikebø, Hege Johansen, Jeanette Nilsen, Kristine Duvholt, Marianne Rokne, Mimi Kopperud Slevigen, Karoline Dyhre Breivang, Monica Sandve, Vigdis Hårsaker.
Coach: Marit Breivik

2001 World Championship (Second place)
Cecilie Leganger, Mimi Kopperud Sleivigen, Heidi Halvorsen, Kjersti Grini (captain), Gro Hammerseng, Kristine Duvholt, Janne Tuven, Marianne Rokne, Else Marthe Sørlie, Elisabeth Hilmo, Monica Sandve, Vigdis Hårsaker, Kristine Lunde, Unni Nyhamar Hinkel, Hanne Halén.
Coach: Marit Breivik

2002 European Championship (Second place)
Anette Hovind Johansen, Birgitte Sættem, Elisabeth Hilmo, Else-Marthe Sørlie Lybekk (captain), Gro Hammerseng, Heidi Tjugum Mørk, Janne Tuven, Kari-Anne Henriksen, Katja Nyberg, Katrine Lunde, Lina Olsson Rosenberg, Mia Hundvin, Mimi Kopperud Slevigen, Monica Sandve, Tonje Larsen, Vigdis Hårsaker.
Coach: Marit Breivik

2003 World Championship (6th place)
Heidi Tjugum, Cecilie Leganger, Katrine Lunde, Gro Hammerseng (captain), Unni Nyhamar Hinkel, Elisabeth Hilmo, Vigdis Hårsaker, Berit Hynne, Anette Hovind Johansen, Tonje Larsen, Kristine Lunde, Else-Marthe Sørlie Lybekk, Katja Nyberg, Linn-Kristin Riegelhuth, Monica Sandve, Ragnhild Aamodt.
Coach: Marit Breivik

2004 European Championship (Winner)
Camilla Thorsen, Elisabeth Hilmo, Else-Marthe Sørlie Lybekk, Gro Hammerseng (captain), Gøril Snorroeggen, Isabel Blanco, Kari Mette Johansen, Karoline Dyhre Breivang, Katja Nyberg, Katrine Lunde, Kjersti Beck, Kristine Lunde, Linn-Kristin Riegelhuth, Ragnhild Aamodt, Randi Gustad, Terese Pedersen, Vigdis Hårsaker.
Coach: Marit Breivik

2005 World Championship (9th place)
Anette Hovind Johansen, Camilla Thorsen, Elisabeth Hilmo (captain), Isabel Blanco, Kari Mette Johansen, Karoline Dyhre Breivang, Katrine Lunde, Kjersti Beck, Kristine Lunde, Linn Jørum Sulland, Marianne Rokne, Ragnhild Aamodt, Randi Gustad, Terese Pedersen, Tonje Nøstvold.
Coach: Marit Breivik

2006 European Championship (Winner)
Anette Hovind Johansen, Anne Kjersti Suvdal, Else-Marthe Sørlie Lybekk, Gro Hammerseng (captain), Gøril Snorroeggen, Kari Aalvik Grimsbø, Kari Mette Johansen, Karoline Dyhre Breivang, Katja Nyberg, Katrine Lunde, Kristine Lunde, Linn-Kristin Riegelhuth, Marianne Rokne, Marit Malm Frafjord, Ragnhild Aamodt, Terese Pedersen, Tonje Nøstvold.
Coach: Marit Breivik

2007 World Championship (Second place)
Anette Hovind Johansen, Else-Marthe Sørlie Lybekk, Gro Hammerseng (captain), Gøril Snorroeggen, Kari Aalvik Grimsbø, Kari Mette Johansen, Karoline Dyhre Breivang, Katja Nyberg, Katrine Lunde Haraldsen, Linn Jørum Sulland, Linn-Kristin Riegelhuth, Marit Malm Frafjord, Ragnhild Aamodt, Terese Pedersen, Tonje Nøstvold, Vigdis Hårsaker.
Coach: Marit Breivik

2008 Summer Olympics (Winner)
Else-Marthe Sørlie Lybekk, Gro Hammerseng (captain), Gøril Snorroeggen, Kari Aalvik Grimsbø, Kari Mette Johansen, Karoline Dyhre Breivang, Katja Nyberg, Katrine Lunde Haraldsen, Kristine Lunde, Linn-Kristin Riegelhuth, Marit Malm Frafjord, Ragnhild Aamodt, Tonje Larsen, Tonje Nøstvold.
Coach: Marit Breivik

2008 European Championship (Winner)
Camilla Herrem, Heidi Løke, Isabel Blanco, Kari Aalvik Grimsbø, Kari Mette Johansen, Karoline Dyhre Breivang, Katrine Lunde Haraldsen, Kristine Lunde (captain), Linn Jørum Sulland, Linn-Kristin Riegelhuth, Marit Malm Frafjord, Ragnhild Aamodt, Terese Pedersen, Tine Rustad Kristiansen, Tonje Larsen, Tonje Nøstvold.
Coach: Marit Breivik

2009 World Championship (Third place)
Kari Aalvik Grimsbø, Renate Urne, Ida Alstad, Heidi Løke, Tonje Nøstvold, Karoline Dyhre Breivang, Katrine Lunde Haraldsen, Kristine Lunde-Borgersen (captain), Kari Mette Johansen, Terese Pedersen, Marit Malm Frafjord, Tonje Larsen, Linn-Kristin Riegelhuth, Tine Stange, Anja Edin, Camilla Herrem.
Coach: Thorir Hergeirsson

2010 European Championship (Winner)
Kari Aalvik Grimsbø, Mari Molid, Nora Mørk, Ida Alstad, Heidi Løke, Tonje Nøstvold, Karoline Dyhre Breivang, Gro Hammerseng (captain), Kari Mette Johansen, Marit Malm Frafjord, Tonje Larsen, Katrine Lunde Haraldsen, Linn Jørum Sulland, Linn-Kristin Riegelhuth, Stine Bredal Oftedal, Tine Stange, Camilla Herrem.
Coach: Thorir Hergeirsson

2011 World Championship (Winner)
Kari Aalvik Grimsbø, Mari Molid, Stine Bredal Oftedal, Ida Alstad, Heidi Løke, Tonje Nøstvold, Karoline Dyhre Breivang, Kristine Lunde-Borgersen, Kari Mette Johansen, Marit Malm Frafjord (captain), Gøril Snorroeggen, Katrine Lunde Haraldsen, Linn Jørum Sulland, Linn-Kristin Riegelhuth Koren, Amanda Kurtović, Camilla Herrem.
Coach: Thorir Hergeirsson

2012 Summer Olympics (Winner)
Kari Aalvik Grimsbø, Ida Alstad, Heidi Løke, Tonje Nøstvold, Karoline Dyhre Breivang, Kristine Lunde-Borgersen, Kari Mette Johansen, Marit Malm Frafjord (captain), Gøril Snorroeggen, Katrine Lunde Haraldsen, Linn Jørum Sulland, Linn-Kristin Riegelhuth Koren, Amanda Kurtović, Camilla Herrem.
Coach: Thorir Hergeirsson

2012 European Championship (Second place)
Karoline Næss, Stine Bredal Oftedal, Ida Alstad, Heidi Løke, Karoline Dyhre Breivang, Kristine Lunde-Borgersen, Anja Edin, Silje Solberg, Marit Malm Frafjord (captain), Ida Bjørndalen, Katrine Lunde Haraldsen, Linn Jørum Sulland, Linn-Kristin Riegelhuth Koren, Linn Gossé, Maja Jakobsen, Camilla Herrem.
Coach: Thorir Hergeirsson

2013 World Championship (5th place)
Mari Molid, Stine Bredal Oftedal, Ida Alstad, Heidi Løke, Tonje Nøstvold, Karoline Dyhre Breivang (captain), Isabel Blanco, Anja Hammerseng-Edin, Silje Solberg, Linn Jørum Sulland, Katrine Lunde, Veronica Kristiansen, Linn-Kristin Riegelhuth Koren, Nora Mørk, Camilla Herrem, Sanna Solberg.
Coach: Thorir Hergeirsson

2014 European Championship (Winner)
Kari Aalvik Grimsbø, Betina Riegelhuth, Emilie Hegh Arntzen, Veronica Kristiansen, Ida Alstad, Heidi Løke, Karoline Dyhre Breivang (captain), Nora Mørk, Stine Bredal Oftedal, Silje Solberg, Ida Bjørndalen Karlsson, Emily Stang Sando, Linn-Kristin Riegelhuth Koren, Maja Jakobsen, Camilla Herrem, Sanna Solberg, Pernille Wibe.
Coach: Thorir Hergeirsson

2015 World Championship (Winner)
Kari Aalvik Grimsbø, Mari Molid, Veronica Kristiansen, Ida Alstad, Heidi Løke, Stine Skogrand, Vilde Ingstad, Nora Mørk, Stine Bredal Oftedal (captain), Silje Solberg, Linn Jørum Sulland, Pernille Wibe, Betina Riegelhuth, Amanda Kurtović, Camilla Herrem, Sanna Solberg, Marta Tomac.
Coach: Thorir Hergeirsson

2016 Summer Olympics (Third place)
Kari Aalvik Grimsbø, Mari Molid, Emilie Hegh Arntzen, Veronica Kristiansen, Ida Alstad, Heidi Løke, Nora Mørk, Stine Bredal Oftedal (captain), Marit Malm Frafjord, Katrine Lunde, Linn-Kristin Riegelhuth Koren, Amanda Kurtović, Camilla Herrem, Sanna Solberg.
Coach: Thorir Hergeirsson

2016 European Championship (Winner)
Kari Aalvik Grimsbø, Emilie Hegh Arntzen, Veronica Kristiansen, Stine Skogrand, Vilde Ingstad, Nora Mørk, Stine Bredal Oftedal (captain), Malin Aune, Silje Solberg, Marit Malm Frafjord, Silje Waade, Kjerstin Boge Solås, Amanda Kurtović, Camilla Herrem, Sanna Solberg, Marta Tomac.
Coach: Thorir Hergeirsson

2017 World Championship (Second place)
Kari Aalvik Grimsbø, Emilie Hegh Arntzen, Veronica Kristiansen, Heidi Løke, Stine Skogrand, Vilde Ingstad, Nora Mørk, Stine Bredal Oftedal (captain), Silje Solberg, Kari Brattset, Katrine Lunde, Helene Gigstad Fauske, Emilie Christensen, Amanda Kurtović, Camilla Herrem, Sanna Solberg, Marit Røsberg Jacobsen.
Coach: Thorir Hergeirsson

2018 European Championship (5th place)
Henny Reistad, Emilie Hegh Arntzen, Veronica Kristiansen, Heidi Løke, Silje Waade, Stine Bredal Oftedal (captain), Malin Aune, Silje Solberg, Kari Brattset, Linn Jørum Sulland, Katrine Lunde, Camilla Herrem, Sanna Solberg, Thea Mørk, Marta Tomac, Marit Røsberg Jacobsen, Vilde Ingstad.
Coach: Thorir Hergeirsson

2019 World Championship (4th place)
Emilie Hegh Arntzen, Heidi Løke, Stine Skogrand, Silje Waade, Stine Bredal Oftedal (captain), Malin Aune, Silje Solberg, Kari Brattset Dale, Andrea Austmo Pedersen, Helene Gigstad Fauske, Moa Högdahl, Marit Røsberg Jacobsen, Ingvild Bakkerud, Camilla Herrem, Sanna Solberg-Isaksen, Kristine Breistøl, Marta Tomac.
Coach: Thorir Hergeirsson

2020 European Championship (Winner)
Emily Stang Sando, Henny Reistad, Emilie Hegh Arntzen, Veronica Kristiansen, Marit Malm Frafjord, Heidi Løke, Stine Skogrand, Nora Mørk, Stine Bredal Oftedal (captain), Malin Aune, Silje Solberg, Kari Brattset Dale, Katrine Lunde, Marit Røsberg Jacobsen, Camilla Herrem, Sanna Solberg-Isaksen, Kristine Breistøl, Marta Tomac, Rikke Granlund.
Coach: Thorir Hergeirsson

2020 Summer Olympics (Third place)
Henny Reistad, Veronica Kristiansen, Marit Malm Frafjord, Stine Skogrand, Nora Mørk, Stine Bredal Oftedal (captain), Silje Solberg, Kari Brattset Dale, Katrine Lunde, Marit Røsberg Jacobsen, Camilla Herrem, Sanna Solberg-Isaksen, Kristine Breistøl, Marta Tomac, Vilde Johansen.
Coach: Thorir Hergeirsson

2021 World Championship (Winner)
Henny Reistad, Emilie Hegh Arntzen, Veronica Kristiansen, Nora Mørk, Stine Bredal Oftedal (captain), Malin Aune, Silje Solberg, Kari Brattset Dale, Vilde Ingstad, Katrine Lunde, Moa Högdahl, Marit Røsberg Jacobsen, Camilla Herrem, Sanna Solberg-Isaksen, Kristine Breistøl, Emilie Hovden, Rikke Granlund, Maren Nyland Aardahl.
Coach: Thorir Hergeirsson

2022 European Championship (Winner)
Marie Davidsen, Emilie Hegh Arntzen, Ragnhild Valle Dahl, Maren Nyland Aardahl, Stine Skogrand, Nora Mørk, Stine Bredal Oftedal (captain), Malin Aune, Silje Solberg-Østhassel, Kristine Breistøl, Vilde Ingstad, Katrine Lunde, Kristina Novak, Henny Reistad, Emilie Hovden, Sunniva Næs Andersen, Anniken Wollik, Thale Rushfeldt Deila, Ane Høgseth.
Coach: Thorir Hergeirsson

Coaches
Frode Kyvåg (1974–1978)
Otto Th. Pedersen (1978–1982)
Karen Fladset (1982–1984)
Sven-Tore Jacobsen (1984–1993)
Marit Breivik (1994–2009)
Thorir Hergeirsson (2009–present)

Captains
Hanne Hegh (World Championship 1986, Olympic Games 1988, World Championship 1990)
Hanne Hogness (Olympic Games 1992)
Susann Goksør Bjerkrheim (World Championship 1993, European Championship 1994, World Championship 1995, Olympic Games 1996, European Championship 1996, World Championship 1997, World Championship 1999, Olympic Games 2000)
Kjersti Grini (European Championship 1998, World Championship 2001)
Else-Marthe Sørlie Lybekk (European Championship 2000, European Championship 2002)
Gro Hammerseng (World Championship 2003, European Championship 2004, European Championship 2006, World Championship 2007, Olympic Games 2008, European Championship 2010)
Elisabeth Hilmo (World Championship 2005)
Kristine Lunde (European Championship 2008, World Championship 2009)
Marit Malm Frafjord (World Championship 2011, Olympic Games 2012, European Championship 2012)
Karoline Dyhre Breivang (World Championship 2013, European Championship 2014)
Stine Bredal Oftedal (World Championship 2015, Olympic Games 2016, European Championship 2016, World Championship 2017, European Championship 2018, World Championship 2019, European Championship 2020, Olympic Games 2020, World Championship 2021, European Championship 2022)

Notable players
Several Norwegian players have seen their individual performance recognized at international tournaments, either as Most Valuable Player, top scorer or as a member of the All-Star Team.
MVP
Cecilie Leganger, 1993 World Championship
Trine Haltvik, 1998 European Championship
Gro Hammerseng, 2004 and 2006 European Championship
Katja Nyberg, 2007 World Championship
Kristine Lunde, 2008 European Championship
Anja Edin, 2012 European Championship
Stine Bredal Oftedal, 2017 World Championship
Kari Brattset Dale, 2021 World Championship
Henny Reistad, 2022 European Championship
All-Star Team
Heidi Sundal, 1992 Summer Olympics; 1993 World Championship
Cecilie Leganger, 1993, 1995, 1999 and 2001 World Championship; 1994 and 1998 European Championship
Kjersti Grini, 1996 and 2000 Summer Olympics; 1998 European Championship
Heidi Tjugum, 1996 European Championship; 2000 Summer Olympics
Tonje Sagstuen, 1997 World Championship
Kristine Duvholt Havnås, 1999 World Championship
Lina Olsson Rosenberg, 2002 European Championship
Gro Hammerseng, 2004, 2006 and 2010 European Championship; 2007 World Championship
Kari Mette Johansen, 2006 European Championship
Else-Marthe Sørlie Lybekk, 2008 Summer Olympics
Katrine Lunde, 2008 and 2020 Summer Olympics; 2008, 2010 and 2012 European Championship, 2017 World Championship
Linn-Kristin Riegelhuth, 2008 European Championship; 2009 World Championship
Tonje Larsen, 2008 European Championship
Kristine Lunde, 2008 European Championship
Camilla Herrem, 2009 and 2019 World Championship, 2016 and 2020 European Championship
Heidi Løke, 2010, 2012 and 2014 European Championship; 2011 and 2015 World Championship, 2012 and 2016 Summer Olympics
Kari Aalvik Grimsbø, 2012 and 2016 Summer Olympics
Nora Mørk, 2014, 2016 and 2020 European Championship; 2015 and 2017 and 2021 World Championship
Silje Solberg, 2014 European Championship
Stine Bredal Oftedal, 2015 World Championship, 2018, 2020 and 2022 European Championship
Henny Reistad, 2021 World Championship
Top scorers
Kjersti Grini, 1996 European Championship (48 goals), 2000 Summer Olympics (61 goals)
Linn-Kristin Riegelhuth, 2008 European Championship (51 goals)
Nora Mørk, 2016 Summer Olympics (62 goals), 2016 European Championship (53 goals), 2017 World Championship (66 goals), 2020 European Championship (52 goals), 2020 Summer Olympics (52 goals), 2022 European Championship (50 goals)

Individual all-time records

Most matches played
Total number of matches played in official competitions only.

Last updated: 5 March 2023Source: handball.no

Most goals scored
Total number of goals scored in official matches only.

Last updated: 5 March 2023Source: handball.no

References

External links

IHF profile

National team
Women's national handball teams
Handball